

Winners and nominees

2010s

2020s

References

External links 

Premios TVyNovelas
TVyNovelas Awards
Television awards for Best Actor
Mexican television awards